Charles S Johnson (born May 5, 1956) is a former American football defensive back who played three seasons in the National Football League (NFL) with the San Francisco 49ers and St. Louis Cardinals. He was drafted by the Atlanta Falcons in the fourth round of the 1979 NFL Draft. Johnson played college football at Grambling State University and attended Mansfield High School in Mansfield, Louisiana. He was also a member of the Ottawa Rough Riders of the Canadian Football League.

References

External links
Just Sports Stats

Living people
1956 births
Players of American football from Louisiana
American football defensive backs
Canadian football defensive backs
American players of Canadian football
Grambling State Tigers football players
San Francisco 49ers players
St. Louis Cardinals (football) players
Ottawa Rough Riders players
People from Mansfield, Louisiana